Hatton is an unincorporated community in Wood County, in the U.S. state of Ohio.

History
Hatton was originally called East Millgrove Station, and under the latter name was platted in 1880. A post office called Hatton was established in 1882, and remained in operation until 1922.

References

Unincorporated communities in Wood County, Ohio
Unincorporated communities in Ohio